Bill Lindau (January 2, 1903 Pittsburgh, Pennsylvania – December 18, 1989 Pittsburgh, Pennsylvania) was an American racecar driver. He competed in two AAA Championship Car races, the 1929 Indianapolis 500 and a race the next month on the board oval in Altoona, Pennsylvania. He failed to finish both races.

Indy 500 results

References

Indianapolis 500 drivers
1903 births
1989 deaths
Sportspeople from Pittsburgh
Racing drivers from Pennsylvania
Racing drivers from Pittsburgh